Shlomo Artzi is an Israeli folk rock musician, composer, music producer, radio broadcaster columnist and singer-songwriter.

He was born on November 26, 1949, in Moshav Alonei Abba. In the course of his career, he has sold over 1.5 million albums, making him one of Israel's most successful male singers.

Early life
Artzi's parents were Holocaust survivors and their memories deeply influenced him and his sister Nava Semel, a playwright. His father, Yitzhak Artzi, a Zionist activist in Bukovina, Romania in his youth, was later a member of the Knesset. His maternal grandmother was the sister of Rabbi Meir Shapiro.

When Artzi was eight years old, his family moved to northern Tel Aviv. Artzi's schoolmates thought he would become an actor, not a musician, as he was known for his acting skills at elementary school. However, at the age of twelve, he started playing the guitar and singing in a boy scouts group and at friends' parties.

Musical career

1960s 
At age 16, he began writing and composing songs. As the Sinai Duo, he started performing before soldiers, along with his classmate Rivka Menashe (now known as Riki Gal).

During his military service, Artzi was recruited to the Artillery Corps, and after serving for a year and a half, he joined Lehakat Kheil Hayam (Naval Corps Entertainment Group). While in this band, he took part in the programs "And on the Third Day" and "Rhapsody in Blue", alongside other soon-to-be Israeli celebrities, such as Rivka Zohar, Dov Glickman, Avi Uriah, Riki Gal, and more. He was yet to stand out during the first program. By the second program, he became the lead singer and one of the main stars. He sang lead vocals on several songs on the Group's LPs.

1970s 
In 1970, Artzi had the opportunity to take part in the Israel Song Festival, a prestigious song contest held every year. Still in military service and wearing a military uniform, he sang Pitom Achshav, Pitom Hayom (Suddenly Now, Suddenly Today), also known as Ahavtiha (I loved her). The song, written by Tirza Atar and composed by Ya'akov Hollander, won first prize. It was included in his first album, Shlomo Artzi, which came out in 1970, and came in first in the annual chart-toppers countdown of Kol Israel. Artzi was voted Singer of the Year.

In 1975 he was selected to represent Israel in the Eurovision Song Contest. The selected song was At Ve'Ani (You and Me), written by the legendary Israeli songwriter Ehud Manor, and composed by Artzi himself. To seize the moment, Artzi's record label pressured him to record a completely new record in less than 2 weeks. However, At Va'Ani didn't win the contest, and the album was a big disappointment.

This marked the beginning of the worst era of Artzi's career. During the next several years, Artzi released several records that failed to sell well, and produced very few hit singles. Later, most of these albums would become rare collectibles, as they were never released again. These include, among others, Miskhakey 26, Shlomo Artzi Shar U'Mesaper Al Ian HaGamad, Yesh Li Isha Yalda Ve'Lambreta Ve'Ani Gar Be'Tel-Aviv, Romansa U'Piyut, and a selection of his best songs from the period 1970–1973, which was released in 1976.

In 1977, after a string of failures, he made "A Man Gets Lost" (גבר הולך לאיבוד, Gever Holekh Le'ibud). The album was sort of a last goodbye to the business. The success of this album persuaded Artzi to continue with his singing career, which rose throughout the 1980s and reached a  peak with the release of the albums "Dance" (Tirkod) and "Restless Night" (לילה לא שקט, Layla Lo Shaket) which sold tens of thousands, and with the live shows that accompanied these albums, which would sell out the largest parks and theatres in Israel. His later album sales, in excess of a hundred thousand per album, and the live shows that followed each album, made him the most popular artist in Israel; Based on album sales and gross income from live shows, he is the most successful singer in Israel. Artzi has sold a total of over a million and a half albums, an unprecedented achievement in the Israeli music industry. He is well known for his marathon live shows, some of which last over two or even three hours.

In 1979 he recorded Drachim (Roads), with a fresher style. His 1981 LP Chatzot (Midnight) was the second part of Drachim.

1980s 
In 1980 Artzi started his own radio show on Israel's Military Radio station, Galey Tzahal. In this show, he talked about the week's headlines and tells interesting stories he has heard or seen during the week. Od Lo Shabat (It isn't Saturday yet) still broadcasts every Friday at 13:10 local time.

His records Tirkod (Dance, 1984), "Layla Lo Shaket" (Restless Night, 1986), and Hom Yuli August (July August Heat, 1988), are milestones of Israeli 1980s songwriting. The albums sold in excess of a hundred thousand copies, an unprecedented achievement in the Israeli music industry, and the live shows that accompanied the albums would sell out even the largest parks and theatres in Israel.

1990s 
In 1992 Artzi released Yareakh (Moon), one of his most successful albums. Out of twelve songs on it, eight became radio hits and finally solidified Artzi's status in Israeli popular music.

In 1995 popular Israeli musicians recorded a CD together in memory of Yitzhak Rabin, named Shalom Chaver. Shlomo Artzi played two songs during the memorial service, which later became anthems of those days – Haish Ha'hu (That Man) and Uf Gozal (Fly Little One), which was originally written and recorded by Arik Einstein and Miki Gavrielov.

In 1996 Artzi released a double album called Shnayim ("Two"), which has sold an almost unprecedented 160,000 copies, making it a certified 4× platinum record. The most notable songs in this CD were the title track, sung with Israeli singer Rita, "Hi Lo Yoda'at Ma Over Alay" ("She Doesn't Know What I'm Going Through"), '"Menagev Lach Et Hadmaot" ("Wiping the Tears For You") "Ze Ma Shenish'ar" ("That's What's Left"), "Ha'ahava Hayeshana" ("The Old Love"), "Le'an, Le'an, Le'an" ("Where, Where, Where"), "Shisha" ("Six"), "Absurd" and "Dokh Retzhakh" ("Murder Report") which reflected on the tragedy of Prime Minister Yitzhak Rabin's assassination and revolved it around another similar tragedy, that of JFK's assassination. Shnayim signaled the beginning of a string of ultra-popular albums of original material from Artzi, which are some of the best-selling Israeli records of all time.

2000s 
In 2000 Artzi released "Ahavtihem" ("I Have Loved Them"), a collection of reworked love songs, many of which were originally written by him for other artists. The album featured many smash hits, including the tender revision of his past hit "Ahavtia" ("I Have Loved Her"), "Nof Yaldoot" ("Childhood's View"), "Anakhnu Lo Tzrikhim" ("We Don't Need"), "At Va'ani" ("You and Me"), "Ma'avir Duff" ("Turning the Page") – a duet with Nurit Galron (which performed the song originally), "Shir Preda" ("A Goodbye Song") – a duet with his singer-songwriter son, Ben Artzi and "Melekh ha'olam" ("King of the World", a Hebrew translated cover of White Plains' "When You Are a King"). The album went on to sell over 200,000 copies – an unprecedented achievement in the little Israeli music market.

Artzi's next original album, "Tzima'on" ("Thirst"), which was released in 2002, featured the title track as its lead single, as well as the more memorable "Al-Pi Tnuat Harakavot" ("According to the Trains' Movement) LeHatzil Otakh ("To Save You") and "Ptzatzat Atom Bashamaim" ("Atom Bomb in the Sky"). The albums were an instant smash hit, selling over 60,000 copies (3× gold record) on the first two weeks of their release and continued the enormous success of their predecessors, yet they were met with harsh reviews, some of which noted the inadequate abundance of quality material. Artzi would later admit of the albums' weakness in select few interviews.

In 2007 Artzi released his highly anticipated follow-up album, "Shfuim" ("Sane"). The album came out in July, with a lead single "Ha'amiti" ("The Real") which was received with by-now standard heavy radio rotation. The album generated several more radio singles to help push it, yet they repeatedly failed to make a lasting impression on fans. The colorless clutter of  "Iceland" and the disappointingly stale and un-melodic collaboration with Mooke (of the breakthrough Rap-Rock band Shabak Samekh), "Hakhaim" ("Life"), hinted of waning creativity of the nation's favorite singer-songwriter. Fourth single finally managed to get a hook across and join Artzi's rich back catalog with pride: "Nitzmadnu" ("We Clinged"), enjoying a catchy sing-along melodic line and an interesting lyric, sharing private memories and reflecting on, among other topics, television's role inside a modern family and on Prime Minister Yitzhak Rabin's Assassination (a recurring subject in Artzi's songs). Finally came out one of Artzi's biggest, most enduring and most memorable songs of recent years, "TeTa'aru Lakhem" ("Imagine Yourselves"), which features one of the best-known, most beloved lines in Artzi song catalog, equipped with a tender, infectious, eternally romantic message: "Imagine yourselves a beautiful world, a little less sad than it actually is, and there we are, walking, with sunshine in our pockets". The song is still a major live-show staple and highlight.

2010s 
In 2012 Artzi finally released a yet-again highly anticipated album of original songs: "Osher Express" ("Happiness Express"). This time around, though, the album enjoyed critical acclaim and commercial success. It featured a very strong collection of new songs, a slew of beloved singles and an intriguing, immediately classic lead-off single: "Khozrim Habaita" ("Coming Home") which featured the ultra-popular, rarely seen on public, iconic Israeli singer Arik Einstein. The album kept shooting off powerful material and rapidly so. Quite quickly came the similarly addictive "Kol Yom" ("Every Day"), the life-affirming duet with Dudu Tasa "Latet Velakakhat" ("Negotiating"), and the spiritual duet with Abraham Tal "Elohim" ("God"). Additional singles came in the form of "Nedaber Mehalev" ("We'll Talk Whole-Heartedly") and "Shelo Yealmu Hadvarim Hayafim" ("Wish That The Beautiful Things Won't Disappear"). Album gems also included the heartfelt and captivating title track, the part-playful, part heart-on-sleeve honesty of "Ometz" ("Courage"), the epic escapism obsession tackle of "Florida", and Artzi's unique narration on the wave of social protests that hit Tel Aviv in 2012, "Kaitz Be'eretz Lu" ("Summer in If-Land").

In 2016, Artzi released a new album: "Katzefet" (cream).

Personal life
Artzi has been married twice and has three children from his first marriage: Ben Artzi (singer), Shiri Artzi (author married with Yiftach Klein), and Jonathan Artzi.

Artzi resides in Tel Aviv. He is known as a fan of the soccer team Maccabi Netanya. In 1971, Artzi composed Maccabi Netanya's championship song.

References

External links
 Shlomo Artzi: Biography, by MSN Music.
 Biography, by Billboard.com
 
 
 

1949 births
Living people
20th-century Israeli male singers
21st-century Israeli male singers
Eurovision Song Contest entrants for Israel
Eurovision Song Contest entrants of 1975
Israeli composers
Israeli film score composers
Israeli male film actors
Israeli male singer-songwriters
Israeli military musicians
Israeli people of Polish-Jewish descent
Israeli people of Romanian-Jewish descent
Israeli pop singers
Jewish Israeli musicians
Male film score composers
People from Northern District (Israel)